Ben Seidman (born December 1, 1984) is an American sleight-of-hand performer, actor, comedian, and creative consultant who has won the entertainer of the year award for Princess Cruises and guest starred on Netflix's "Brainchild".  He is the only person to have served as the Resident Magician at Mandalay Bay Resort & Casino in Las Vegas. In 2013, Seidman co-starred in Magic Outlaws on Travel Channel. Following the debut of his TV specials, Ben taught Johnny Knoxville magic tricks for his film Jackass Presents: Bad Grandpa. Seidman’s performances are notable for featuring original magic effects. His inventions are employed in A&E’s program Mindfreak, starring Criss Angel, where Seidman served as writer and adviser for three seasons.  Seidman tours globally, bringing his live show—a combination of sleight-of-hand, pickpocketing, and comedy—to colleges, parties and events.

He is currently based in Los Angeles, where he performs at the Magic Castle in Hollywood and The Comedy & Magic Club in Hermosa Beach.

Performances/TV Specials
In 2011, Seidman starred in a series of hidden camera videos using his pick-pocketing skills to slip computers into people’s handbags without them knowing. The “I Was Framed” project, directed by Jamie Kennedy and Michael Addis, and also featuring Bob Arno, gained online popularity and quickly reached over 900,000 views.

In 2013, Seidman co-starred in Magic Outlaws on Travel Channel. The two TV specials, High Noon in Austin and 3:10 to Vegas, follow Seidman and fellow Los Angeles-based magicians Chris Korn and David Minkin, as they travel across the country performing close up magic for onlookers. In 2018, he guest starred on three episodes of the Netflix original series "Brainchild," produced by Pharrell.

Seidman was featured on two national comedy tours produced by Just For Laughs in 2010 and 2013. The 2013 tour spanned 21 cities throughout Canada and is the subject of a documentary produced for The Comedy Network.  The documentary also features tour-mates Tom Papa, Alonzo Bodden, Jeremy Hotz, Robert Kelly, Orny Adams, and host Darrin Rose.

In his performance career, Seidman has headlined the Atlantis Casino in the Bahamas, performed 120 Shows at The Venetian in Macau, China, and was featured in a four-month run at Harrah’s Hotel and Casino. He has performed for a number of celebrities including Robin Williams, Christina Hendricks, Stephen Merchant, and Carrot Top. Seidman, along with Marcus Monroe and Luke Jermay is a founding member of The Optical Delusions, a 2008 touring show that billed itself as "an evening of new-school variety." In 2019 Seidman began performing a two-person show with Shin Lim, winner of America's Got Talent: The Champions.

Creative consulting
In 2006, Seidman was hired as a magic consultant for Mindfreak on A&E starring Criss Angel. Seidman created content, invented magic effects, and served as a creative/technical advisor to the show for three seasons.

Seidman spent the summer of 2011 in Stockholm, Sweden writing and directing Helt Magiskt for SVT, the prime television channel in Sweden. Helt Magiskt, the Swedish adaptation of the BBC show The Magicians, followed Charlie Caper, winner of Sweden's Got Talent, Michael Halvorsen, Star of Cirque du Soleil’s Koozå, and large-scale illusionist Joe Labero, as they performed alongside celebrities. Shortly after, Seidman returned to Stockholm to work with Charlie Caper creating a performance piece using iPads. The video has over 3.36 million hits on YouTube.

In 2013, Seidman taught actor Johnny Knoxville magic tricks for his role in Jackass Presents: Bad Grandpa, an Academy Award nominated hidden-camera comedy film written by Spike Jonze, Johnny Knoxville, and Jeff Tremaine. Seidman taught Knoxville a number of tricks and gags for the film, most notably, how to pull flowers out of his pants.

References

 Olig, Nick. "Ben Seidman's Sleight of Hand." Shepherd Express 3 October 2013. Express Milwaukee
 Hintz, Martin. "Magic Man." M Magazine January 2013. GM Today
 Nuñez, Candace. "Magician steals more than show." La Verne Campus Times 1 March 2013. Campus Times

External links

1984 births
Living people
Male actors from Milwaukee
American magicians
American male comedians
Pickpocket entertainers
Mentalists
Participants in American reality television series
Sleight of hand
Comedians from Wisconsin
21st-century American comedians